This is a list of fossiliferous stratigraphic units in Croatia.



List of fossiliferous stratigraphic units

See also 
 Lists of fossiliferous stratigraphic units in Europe
 List of fossiliferous stratigraphic units in Bosnia and Herzegovina
 List of fossiliferous stratigraphic units in Hungary
 List of fossiliferous stratigraphic units in Italy
 List of fossiliferous stratigraphic units in Serbia
 List of fossiliferous stratigraphic units in Slovenia

References

Further reading 
Paleogene
 F. Grandi and F. Bona. 2017. Prominatherium dalmatinum from the late Eocene of Grancona (Vicenza, NE Italy). The oldest terrestrial mammal of the Italian peninsula. Comptes Rendus Palevol 16(7):738-745
 C. E. Schweitzer, A. M. Shirk, V. Cosovic, Y. Okan, R. M. Feldmann and I. Hosgor. 2007. New species of Harpactocarcinus from the Tethyan Eocene and their paleoecological setting. Journal of Paleontology 81(5):1091-1100
 G. Kolosvary. 1967. Korallen und Balaniden aus den paläogenen Schichten Jugoslawiens [Corals and balanids from Paleogene beds of Yugoslavia]. Geologija 10:205-218
 R. Pavlovec. 1959. Zgornjeeocenska favna iz okolice Drnisa [Upper Eocene fauna from Drnis area]. Razprave Slovenska Akademija Znanosti in Umetnosti, Razred za Prirodoslovne in Medicinske Vede 5:349-416

Cretaceous
 D. K. Hennhoefer, E. Pascual-Cebrian, T. Korbar, W. Stinnesbeck, and S. Goetz. 2014. Radiolitid rudist colonisation strategies and biostrome development in moderate-energy inner-platform environments (Campanian, Brac Island, Croatia). Palaeogeography, Palaeoclimatology, Palaeoecology 403:80-87
 T. Korbar, B. C. Tesovic, I. Radovanovic, K. Krizmanic, T. Steuber and P. W. Skelton. 2010. Campanian Pseudosabinia from the Pucisca Formation on the island of Hvar (Adriatic Sea, Croatia). Turkish Journal of Earth Sciences 19:721-731
 T. Korbar. 2007. Intra-association development and paleobiology of Upper Cretaceous rudist Biradiolites angulosus. In R. W. Scott (ed.), Cretaceous rudists and carbonate platforms: environmental feedback, SEPM Special Publication 87:141-150
 A. Mezga, C. A. Meyer, B. C. Tesovic, Z. Bajraktarevic, and I. Gusic. 2006. The first record of dinosaurs in the Dalmatian part (Croatia) of the Adriatic-Dinaric carbonate platform (ADCP). Cretaceous Research 27:735-742
 J. P. Masse, M. Fenerci-Masse, T. Korbar and I. Velic. 2004. Lower Aptian rudist faunas (Bivalvia, Hippuritoidea) from Croatia. Geologia Croatica 57(2):117-137
 A. Laviano and P. W. Skelton. 1992. Favus antei, a new genus and species of a bizarre "big cell" radiolitid from the Upper Cretaceous of eastern Tethys. Geologica Romana 28:61-77

Jurassic
 A. Mezga, D. Buckovic, and F. Santak. 2017. New dinosaur tracksite in the Late Jurassic of Kirmenjak quarry (Istria). Rivista Italiana di Paleontologia e Stratigrafia 123(3):443-454
 A. Mezga, B. C. Tesovic, and Z. Bajraktarevic. 2007. First record of dinosaurs in the Late Jurassic of the Adriatic-Dinaridic carbonate platform (Croatia). Palaios 22(2):188-199

Triassic
 B. Sokac and T. Grgasovic. 1998. Asterocalculus heraki n. gen., n. sp., a new calcareous alga (Gymnocodiaceae) from the Upper Triassic Hauptdolomite of Zumberak, north Croatia. Facies 38:197-206

Permian
 J. Sremac. 1986. Middle Permian brachiopods from the Velebit Mts. (Croatia, Yogoslavia). Palaeontologia Jugoslavica 35:1-43
 E. Flügel, V. Kochansky-Devidé, and A. Ramovs. 1984. A Middle Permian calcisponge/algal/cement reef: Straza near Bled, Slovenia. Facies 10:179-256

 Croatia
Geology of Croatia
 
Fossiliferous stratigraphic units